St Catherine's School is a Catholic private school for girls in Twickenham, London.

History
Founded in a large house near Twickenham Green, St Catherine's then moved to Orford Lodge (now demolished) and in 1919 to Pope's Villa, on the site of Alexander Pope's original villa. By 1961 it was recognised by the Ministry of Education as a grammar school. In 1948 the school bought a house on Cross Deep known as The Lawn, where it is currently located.

Up until 1991 the school was home to a number of Sisters who were also members of the staff. They moved out and the school became a charitable trust managed by lay persons in 1992. It is the only independent Roman Catholic girls' school in the Richmond area and is within the Archdiocese of Westminster. It remains a Roman Catholic foundation but takes students of all religious affiliations. It has a preparatory school (entry typically at three-years-old) and a senior school (entry at eleven-years-old). Nearly one-third of the pupils are of minority ethnic groups, but more than ninety per cent of the pupils have English as a first language.

Notable former pupils

Olivia Hallinan
Patsy Kensit
Bonnie Langford
Annie Nightingale

See also
List of schools in Twickenham

References

External links 
 School Website
 Profile on the Independent Schools Council website
 Profile on MyDaughter
 OFSTED entry for St Catherine's School
 2011 ISI Inspection Reports

Educational institutions established in 1914
Member schools of the Girls' Schools Association
Private girls' schools in London
Private schools in the London Borough of Richmond upon Thames
Roman Catholic private schools in the Archdiocese of Westminster
Sisters of Mercy schools
Twickenham
1914 establishments in England